Wind of Change is the debut studio album by English rock musician Peter Frampton. It was released in 1972. The album features appearances by Ringo Starr, Billy Preston and Klaus Voormann.

Background 
Peter Frampton decided to remain with Humble Pie's U.S. label A&M, and assembled an impressive supporting cast including Ringo Starr, Billy Preston, Spooky Tooth members Mick Jones and Mike Kellie, and former Herd member Andy Bown, for his first solo effort following his departure from Humble Pie in 1971.

The self-produced debut album was engineered by Chris Kimsey, who had worked on Humble Pie's Rock On. Frampton and Kimsey together introduced a melodic sensibility that contrasted with the raucous boogie that characterized the Humble Pie sound, with a particular emphasis on Frampton's acoustic guitar work. Kimsey continued to work with Frampton on the production of his albums throughout the 1970s.

Many of the songs on Wind of Change are built primarily around acoustic guitar foundations, but the inclusion of such songs as "It's a Plain Shame", and "All I Want To Be (Is By Your Side)" have a hard rock edge, as does an extended reworking of the Rolling Stones "Jumpin' Jack Flash", which was the project's only non-Frampton composition. The brass arrangements in this latter song and "The Lodger", performed by Jim Price, are strongly reminiscent of that in the Rolling Stones' song "Bitch", recorded the previous year, in which Price participated.

Track listing
All songs written by Peter Frampton except "Jumpin' Jack Flash", written by Mick Jagger and Keith Richards.

Side One
 "Fig Tree Bay"  –	3:36
 "Wind of Change" – 3:05
 "Lady Lieright" – 2:56
 "Jumpin' Jack Flash" (Jagger, Richards) – 5:20
 "It's a Plain Shame" – 3:14
 "Oh for Another Day" – 3:53

Side Two
 "All I Wanna Be (Is By Your Side)" – 6:36
 "The Lodger" – 5:44
 "Hard" – 4:30
 "Alright" – 4:26

Personnel 
Peter Frampton – lead vocals, lead guitar, acoustic guitar, Hammond organ, keyboards, drums, percussion, dulcimer, harmonium, vocals
Frank Carillo – rhythm guitar, backing vocals
Mick Jones – rhythm guitar on "All I Want To Be (Is By Your Side)"
Andy Bown – bass guitar, Hammond organ, electric piano, Mellotron, percussion, backing vocals
Rick Wills – bass guitar
Klaus Voormann – bass guitar on "Alright"
Billy Preston – piano, Hammond organ on "Alright" 
Mike Kellie – drums, percussion
Ringo Starr – drums on "Alright" and "The Lodger"
Chris Karan – congas on "Lady Lieright"
Frank Ricotti – shaker on "Lady Lieright"
Del Newman – strings arrangements, flute, marimba
Jim Price – brass on "The Lodger"

Production 
Producers: Peter Frampton, Chris Kimsey
Engineers: Peter Frampton, Chris Kimsey

Charts 
Album

Single

References

Peter Frampton albums
1972 debut albums
Albums produced by Chris Kimsey
Albums produced by Peter Frampton
A&M Records albums
Albums recorded at Olympic Sound Studios